Anna Bass (1876–1961) was a French sculptor born in Strasbourg.

At a special exhibition of Alsace artists at the Paris Salon in 1920, Bass exhibited one terracotta and two bronze sculptures. In 1927 her works were in the collections of the Luxembourg Gallery, Paris and the Strasbourg Museum.

References

20th-century French sculptors
1876 births
1961 deaths
20th-century French women artists